The 2024 ICC T20 World Cup can refer to:

 2024 ICC Men's T20 World Cup, the ninth edition of the ICC Men's T20 World Cup scheduled to be held in the United States and the West Indies in June 2024
 2024 ICC Women's T20 World Cup, the ninth edition of the ICC Women's T20 World Cup scheduled to be held in Bangladesh in September and October 2024